Cheraghabad Cham Nus (also Romanized as Cherāghābād Cham Nūs; also known simply as Cherāghābād) is a village in Kakavand-e Gharbi Rural District, Kakavand District, Delfan County, Lorestan Province, Iran. At the 2006 census, its population was 108, in 20 families.

References 

Towns and villages in Delfan County